Kamjong District (Meitei pronunciation: /kām-jōng/) is a district in Manipur state, India created by splitting Ukhrul district.

The district headquarters is located in Kamjong. Kamjong District is a newly created district on 8 December 2016 and shares a long international border with Myanmar. It is bounded by Myanmar in the east, Senapati in the West, Ukhrul in the North and Chandel in the South. The terrain of the district is hilly with varying heights of 913 m to 3114 m (MSL). The district headquarter is linked with state highway of 120 Km from Imphal.

Demographics 
Kamjong district has a population of 45,616. Scheduled Castes and Scheduled Tribes make up 0.05% and 96.56% of the population respectively.

Sub-divisions
The following are the sub-divisions in Kamjong district:
 Kamjong
 Sahamphung
 Kasom Khullen
 Phungyar

See also 
 List of populated places in Kamjong district

Notes

References 

 
Districts of Manipur
2016 establishments in Manipur